Nick Bowers (born May 26, 1996) is an American football tight end for the Cincinnati Bengals of the National Football League (NFL). He played college football at Penn State.

Early life and high school
Bowers attended Kittanning High School and was a four-year letterman. In his senior year, Bowers played wide receiver and caught 32 passes for 503 yards and scored 10 touchdowns. Bowers was a 3-star recruit according to 247Sports.com. He originally committed to Pittsburgh, but decommited. A day later, he committed to Penn State.

College career
Bowers was redshirted his first true freshman year at Penn State and redshirted his freshman year after sustaining an injury.

As a sophomore, he finished the season with one catch for 15 yards and a touchdown.

As a junior, he finished with a career high of 6 catches for 50 yards and a touchdown. Bowers caught a touchdown in the 2019 Citrus Bowl.

Bowers shined in his senior year at Penn State. He started in 2 games and in total played in 13 games. He caught ten passes for 210 yards and three touchdowns.

Professional career

Las Vegas Raiders
Bowers went undrafted in the 2020 NFL Draft, and signed with the Las Vegas Raiders as an undrafted free agent on May 5, 2020. He was waived during final roster cuts on September 5, 2020, and signed to the team's practice squad the next day. He was placed on the practice squad/COVID-19 list by the team on December 3, 2020, and restored to the practice squad six days later. He signed a reserve/future contract on January 5, 2021.

Bowers made the Raiders 53-man roster in 2021. He played in two games as a special teamer before being placed on injured reserve on October 23, 2021. He was activated on December 20.

On August 28, 2022, Bowers was waived by the Raiders.

Cincinnati Bengals
On September 1, 2022, the Cincinnati Bengals signed Bowers to their practice squad. Bowers was elevated to the active roster for the Divisional round game against the Buffalo Bills on January 22, 2023. He signed a reserve/future contract on January 31, 2023.

References

1996 births
Living people
People from Kittanning, Pennsylvania
Players of American football from Pennsylvania
Sportspeople from the Pittsburgh metropolitan area
American football tight ends
Penn State Nittany Lions football players
Las Vegas Raiders players
Cincinnati Bengals players